Glutamate-ammonia ligase (glutamine synthetase) pseudogene 4 is a protein that in humans is encoded by the GLULP4 pseudogene.

References  

Pseudogenes